The 13th Asia Pacific Screen Awards were held on 21 November 2019 in Brisbane, Australia.

Winners and nominees

Complete list of winners and nominees:

References 

Asia Pacific Screen Awards
Asia Pacific Screen Awards
Asia Pacific Screen Awards
Asia Pacific Screen Awards